Kropilai is a village in Kėdainiai district municipality, in Kaunas County, in central Lithuania. It is located by the river Smilga and regional way Jonava-Šeduva (KK144). According to the 2011 census, the village has a population of 13 people.

Demography

References

Villages in Kaunas County
Kėdainiai District Municipality